In 2010, the Caucasian Knot described the women of South Ossetia as females who can transmit change and reinstatement of "trust and peace" between the peoples of South Ossetia and Georgia.  They have the capability and competence to defend and preserve their rights as women and to participate as activists and peacemakers.  South Ossetian women experienced situations of armed conflict in their regions.  The main organization that promotes and safeguards the status of South Ossetian women is the Association of South Ossetian Women for Democracy and Human Rights (sometimes referred to as Association of Women of South Ossetia for Democracy and Defence of Human Rights) and is currently headed by Lira Kozaeva-Tskhovrebova.

See also
Georgian-Ossetian conflict
Georgian-Ossetian conflict (1918-1920)

References

Further reading
Tskhovrebova, Lira. I survived the Georgian war. Here's what I saw., csmonitor.com, October 8, 2008
Tskhoverebova, Lira.Georgia's shameful attack on South Ossetia, latimes.com, November 17, 2008

External links

Society of South Ossetia
South Ossetia